"Jigsaw Falling into Place" is a song by the English rock band Radiohead, produced by Nigel Godrich. It was released as the lead single from Radiohead's seventh studio album In Rainbows (2007) on 14 January 2008. The music video, directed by Garth Jennings and Adam Buxton, sees Radiohead performing in their studio with cameras attached to bicycle helmets.

Writing
Radiohead performed first "Jigsaw Falling into Place" on their 2006 tour with the working title "Open Pick". Mike Diver of Drowned in Sound described it as a "bass-propelled pop-rock head-bobber". 

The lyrics were inspired by the chaos witnessed by the singer, Thom Yorke, when out drinking in Oxford. He said: "The lyrics are quite caustic—the idea of 'before you're comatose' or whatever, drinking yourself into oblivion and getting fucked-up to forget ... [there] is partly this elation. But there's a much darker side." Adam Buxton, who co-directed the music video, said the song was about "being out on the town on a lairy Saturday night".

Release
"Jigsaw Falling into Place" was released on 14 January 2008 on XL Records as the lead single from Radiohead's seventh studio album, In Rainbows (2007). Yorke's performances of "Videotape", "Down is the New Up" and "Last Flowers" from the television series From the Basement were included as B-sides.

The single reached #30 in the UK Singles Chart in its first week of release, Radiohead's lowest chart entry since "Lucky" in 1995. It spent several weeks as one of the 100 most played songs on US modern rock radio, peaking at #69.

Music video
The "Jigsaw Falling Into Place" music video was directed by Garth Jennings and Adam Buxton. Recorded in two takes, it features the members of Radiohead performing in their studio with footage shot from cameras attached to bicycle helmets. 

The American singer David Byrne, who was visiting the Radiohead studio, watched an early edit and assumed the helmets would be cut from the video. However, Buxton felt it was important that the "ridiculous" helmets were visible. He said later: "For me, that was the point. It's funny ... [Radiohead] completely got what was good about the idea. They committed to it and they performed it brilliantly. And Thom was mesmerising and each member of the band was just giving it." Though Buxton said it was one of the least popular Radiohead videos, he considered it among his best work.

Reception 
Time named "Jigsaw Falling into Place" the fifth-best song of 2007. The Time writer Josh Tyrangiel praised its "tightness" and rising intensity, which he likened to a three-act play. He described the song as "a journey through flirtation, consummation and regret [that] gets about as close as you can to summing up a doomed relationship in four minutes". 

Drowned in Sound described the song as "easy enough on the ear for indirect consumption ... but compositionally complex beneath a deceptively simple outer gloss for long-standing admirers to get sufficient kicks from". However, Clash wrote: "It's good but, like the much-hyped In Rainbows album, musically it's (relatively) unadventurous." In 2016, Rolling Stone readers voted it one of the best Radiohead songs released since the 1990s. Jared Parker of Singersroom pointed out the cryptic and mysterious nature of lyrics that curated a complex story of romantic obsession and unrequited love.

Along with the 2000 Radiohead song "Everything in Its Right Place", "Jigsaw Falling into Place" inspired the composer Steve Reich's 2012 instrumental work Radio Rewrite. Reich described "Jigsaw Falling into Place" as "a beautiful song" with "elaborate harmonic movement".

Track listing
7"
 "Jigsaw Falling into Place" – 4:09
 "Videotape" (Live from the Basement) – 4:26
CD
 "Jigsaw Falling into Place" – 4:09
 "Down Is the New Up" (Live from the Basement) – 5:07
 "Last Flowers" (Live from the Basement) – 4:11

Personnel 
 Colin Greenwood
 Jonny Greenwood
 Ed O'Brien
 Philip Selway
 Thom Yorke

Production

 Stanley Donwood – cover art
 Nigel Godrich – production, mixing, engineering
 Dan Grech-Marguerat – engineering
 Bob Ludwig – mastering
 The Millennia Ensemble – strings
 Hugo Nicolson – engineering
 Graeme Stewart – preproduction
 Richard Woodcraft – engineering

References

External links
  - the music video for the song on the band's YouTube page.

Radiohead songs
2007 songs
2008 singles
XL Recordings singles
British pop rock songs
Song recordings produced by Nigel Godrich
Songs written by Thom Yorke
Songs written by Colin Greenwood
Songs written by Jonny Greenwood
Songs written by Philip Selway
Songs written by Ed O'Brien
Black-and-white music videos
Songs about alcohol